Paul W. Davenport is an American physiologist, focusing in the relationship between respiratory mechanics and the neural mechanisms of respiratory sensation, currently a Distinguished Professor at University of Florida.

References

Year of birth missing (living people)
Living people
University of Florida faculty
American physiologists
University of Kentucky alumni